Wetumka Public Schools is a school district in Wetumka, Oklahoma which includes an elementary school and a high school. It is governed by an elected board of education.

Wetumka Public Schools is located at:
410 East Benson
Wetumka, Oklahoma 74883

References

External links
 

School districts in Oklahoma
Education in Hughes County, Oklahoma